Ypsolopha helva is a moth of the family Ypsolophidae. It is known from north-western China.

The length of the forewings is 6.7 mm.

Etymology
The specific name helva is derived from the Latin adjective helvus (meaning pale yellow) and refers to the yellowish white forewing of the new species.

References

Ypsolophidae
Moths of Asia